Steven Goode may refer to:

Steven Goode (lawyer), American lawyer
Steven Goode, a contestant of Big Brother 15 (UK)